Richard Pace was an early settler and Ancient Planter of Colonial Jamestown, Virginia. According to a 1622 account published by the London Company, Richard Pace played a key role in warning the Jamestown colony of an impending Powahatan raid on the colony.

Origins
The origins of Richard and Isabella Pace are not known.  They may have been the couple who married in  St. Dunstan's Parish Church in October 1608: "Richard Pace of Wapping Wall Carpenter and Isabell Smyth of the same marryed the 5th day October 1608."  St Dunstan's has historic links with the sea and with seafarers, and was until recently the "Church of the High Seas", where births, deaths, and marriages at sea were registered.  In the 17th century, when Richard Pace and Isabell Smyth married there, the parish included Wapping, a waterfront area occupied by mariners, boatbuilders, merchants, victuallers, and others concerned with London's burgeoning maritime ventures.  These associations, taken together with the names, make it plausible that the couple who married in Stepney subsequently voyaged to Virginia and were in fact the same persons as Richard and Isabella Pace of Jamestown.  However, no proof has emerged.

Pace's Paines

As Ancient Planters, Richard and Isabella Pace each received a land grant of 100 acres under the headright system established in 1618. Although Richard Pace's original patent has not survived, two later patents give details of the location and date.

Pace died by 1625, and his wife Isabella remarried William Perry.  Perry thus became stepfather to Richard Pace's adolescent son George.  Three years later, in 1628, George Pace claimed the land and headrights he had inherited from his father:

The patent record shows that of these 400 acres, 100 were due "for the personal adventure of Richard Pace", and the other 300 for the importation of six persons -— each of these being worth a headright of 50 acres.  The six are named in the patent as Lewis Bayly, Richard Irnest, John Skinner, Bennett Bulle, Roger Macher, and Ann Mason.

In the same month, Richard Pace's widow (now Isabella Perry) repatented the remainder of the original Pace grant—the 100 acres that had been granted "for her own personal adventure"—thus putting the land in her own name.  At the same time, she also patented 100 acres which had originally granted to Francis Chapman (another "Ancient Planter") and which Isabella had apparently acquired by purchase:

Quitrent of one shilling per 50 acres is specified in both these patents.  Since Ancient Planters who had paid their own passage were to receive the land free of quitrent, this shows that Richard and Isabella Pace did not pay their own passage but were brought at the London Company's expense, probably as Company employees.

Having acquired their land, Richard and Isabella Pace made a return trip to England, apparently to find and bring back with them servants to help with the clearing and cultivation.   They returned on the Marmaduke in August 1621, bringing with them the six persons later named as headrights in George Pace's 1628 patent (above).  They brought with them also a young woman named Ursula Clawson, described as  "kinswoeman to Richard Pace an olde Planter in Virginia whoe hath given his bonde to pay for her passadge and other Chardges".  Among the other passengers on this sailing of the Marmaduke were a dozen women, sent by the Virginia Company "for wiues for the people in Virginia."  Ursula Clawson was included in this group, but it appears she was not obliged to take her chances in the marriage auction since her passage was to be paid by Richard Pace.  A copy of the bill for her passage was sent to Virginia on the same sailing, and is mentioned in the accompanying letter from the Virginia Company to the Council:

There appear to be no further records mentioning Ursula Clawson.  Of the six Marmaduke passengers who were later named as headrights in George Pace's 1628 patent, only John Skinner appears again: he is listed in the 1624/5 Muster, still at Pace's Paines, described as a servant in the muster of Phettiplace Close.

In recent years, archeological excavations have been carried out at the location of the Pace's Paines plantation in an effort to learn more about early colonial life. A state historical marker near the location recounts some of the history of Pace's Paines.

Warning Jamestown
In April 1622, in the aftermath of the 1622 Powahatan attack on Jamestown, the Council in Virginia wrote to the London Company giving news of the disaster.  That letter gives few details of the attack and does not mention warnings, though it does say that the Indians had attempted "...to haue Swept vs away at once through owte the whole lande, had it nott plesed god of his abundant mercy to prevent them in many places."

George Sandys, Treasurer in Virginia, also wrote a letter to England about the attack and its consequences, and evidently went into much more detail.

Sandys's letter was apparently the original source of the story of the Indian who warned Richard Pace.  According to the story, a Powahatan youth living in the household of Richard Pace had been instructed to kill Pace and his family in conjunction with a planned attack on the colony.  The youth instead warned Pace of the impending attack.  After securing his household, Pace rowed across the James River to warn James City.

Though directed to the London Company, Sandys's account of the massacre seems to have been widely read and gossiped about in England, perhaps due to the efforts of professional correspondents such as Nathaniel Butter, John Pory (a former Secretary of the Virginia Colony), and the Rev. Joseph Mead—all of whom knew and corresponded with each other and with a wide range of newsworthy persons.  A letter received by Joseph Mead in July 1622 refers to the massacre, and mentions "an Indian boy" warning a colonist:

The London Company's Account 

In August 1622, the London Company published their official response to the news of the massacre, in the form of a pamphlet compiled by Edward Waterhouse, Secretary to the London Company.  This pamphlet, entitled "A declaration of the state of the colony and affaires in Virginia : With a relation of the barbarous massacre in the time of peace and league, treacherously executed by the natiue infidels vpon the English, the 22 of March last" was essentially a damage-limitation exercise by the London Company, trying to reassure disgruntled shareholders and potential emigrants, and restore the reputation of Virginia as a place where reasonable persons might hope to make their fortune.  Significantly, Waterhouse's pamphlet announces a change of policy towards the Indians:

Waterhouse presents the colonists' efforts to convert the Indians to Christianity as evidence of the "gentlenesse and faire usage" with which the Indians had (according to Waterhouse) previously been treated.  He goes on to say that "...it pleased God to vse some of them as instruments to saue many of their liues, whose soules they had formerly saued, as at Iames-Cittie, and other places, and the Pinnace trading in Pamounkey Riuer, all whose liues were saued by a conuerted Indian, disclosing the plot in an instant."

Waterhouse then cites the letters from George Sandys:

Although the number of the dead, as given in this account, is more or less accurate (the total killed being 347), the reference to "thousands" being saved is hyperbolic, since the population of the colony at the time of the massacre was only about 1240.

Waterhouse's pamphlet was incorporated into the Records of the Virginia Company of London, now held by the Library of Congress

It may be significant that George Sandys was located near Richard Pace, and may have been one of the first to whom Pace passed on the warning.  A map of settlements and plantations along the James shows the Treasurer's land near Paces Paines.

Later Accounts 

In his General Historie of Virginia Capt. John Smith (who was not in Virginia at the time of the massacre) gave a long and detailed account of the events, including not only the story of the Indian who warned Richard Pace, but also accounts of warnings given in other places.  However, his account of the warning given to Richard Pace adds nothing to the version published by Waterhouse.

In 1705, Robert Beverley included an account of the Indian's warning to Pace in his history of Virginia.<ref>

Richard Pace died before 9 May 1625 when his widow Isabella testified in court as Mrs. Isabella Perry, showing that by that date she had married William Perry. Isabella would also outlive William Perry and marry George Menefie, a merchant in Jamestown, after August 1637.

Descendants

The 1628 land patent quoted above shows that Richard Pace had a son named George Pace.  The following Virginia Colonial land abstract of a quitclaim dated 25 February 1658/9, shows that George Pace married Sara Maycocke, whose father, the Rev. Samuel Maycock, was killed in the 1622 attack.  The quitclaim also shows that George and Sarah Pace had a son named Richard:

This second Richard Pace had a wife named Mary, as shown by a Charles City, Virginia court record dated 13 March 1661/2, in which Richard Pace sells land "with consent of my wife, Mary Pace".  He died by 14 February 1677/78, when administration was granted to Mary Pace on the estate of "Richard Pace, her deceased husband".  No will survives.  On the basis of a family letter (said to have been written in 1791), John Frederick Dorman, editor of Adventurers of Purse and Person, attributes eight children to Richard Pace of Charles City County, and gives information on descendants of three of the sons.

Further reading
 Wesley Frank Craven, The Dissolution of the Virginia Company: the failure of a colonial experiment (Oxford University Press, 1930)
 John Frederick Dorman, Adventurers of Purse and Person, Virginia, 1607-1624/5: Families G-P, (Genealogical Pub. Co., 2005)
 Charles E. Hatch, The First Seventeen Years: Virginia 1607-1624 (University of Virginia Press, 1957)
 Helen C. Rountree, Pocahontas's People: : the Powhatan Indians of Virginia through four centuries (University of Oklahoma Press, 1996)

References

External links
Evolution of the Virginia Colony, 1611-1624 (Library of Congress)
Encyclopedia Virginia: Chauco (fl. 1622–1623)
"The Historical Background of the Mount Pleasant-Swann's Point Tract, Surry County Virginia: Early Origins: The Pace and Perry Plantations" by Martha W. McCartney

1620s deaths
Virginia colonial people
Year of birth unknown
English emigrants
People from Wapping
1583 births
People from Charles City County, Virginia
People from Jamestown, Virginia